The Concert Collection 2012–2018 is a three-disc live album by Australian singer-songwriter Archie Roach. The album features live recordings from Roach's three most recent studio albums. The album was released in May 2019.

In July 2019, Roach was nominated for two awards at the 2019 National Indigenous Music Awards; including Album of the Year.

Background
Disc 1 combines live recordings from The Arts Centre in Melbourne in November 2012, and from the State Theatre in Sydney in January 2013 from the Into the Bloodstream tour.

Disc 2 was the Let Love Rule concert in Melbourne Recital Centre in October 2016 and featured the voices of both the Dhungala Children's Choir and Short Black Opera.

Disc 3 was recorded at Hamer Hall at Arts Centre in Melbourne on 6 May 2018, with Tiddas for the Dancing with My Spirit concert.

Reception
Jeff Jenkins from Stack called it "a deeply moving collection" and called out Roach's resonant tone as "the star of the show". Jenkins also called for Roach to be inducted into the ARIA Hall of Fame.

Angustus Welby from Beat Magazine called the release "a celebration of his three-decade legacy".

Track listing

Charts

Release history

References

2019 live albums
Archie Roach albums
Live albums by Australian artists